Kabud Cheshmeh (also Romanized as Kabūd Cheshmeh and Kabūd Chashmeh; also known as Khalifali, Khalif‘alu, Khalīfeh ‘Alī, and Khalīfehlū) is a village in Sain Qaleh Rural District, in the Central District of Abhar County, Zanjan Province, Iran. At the 2006 census, its population was 1,015, in 243 families.

References 

Populated places in Abhar County